Frank Eisenberg (7 December 1943 – 12 August 2014) was a German long-distance runner. He competed in the men's 5000 metres at the 1972 Summer Olympics, representing East Germany.

References

1943 births
2014 deaths
People from Freital
German male long-distance runners
Sportspeople from Saxony
Olympic athletes of East Germany
Athletes (track and field) at the 1972 Summer Olympics